Major histocompatibility complex, class II, DP alpha 1, also known as HLA-DPA1, is a human gene.

Function 
The protein encoded by this gene belongs to the HLA class II alpha chain paralogues. The class II molecule is a heterodimer consisting of an alpha (DPA) and a beta chain (DPB), both anchored in the membrane. It plays a central role in the immune system by presenting peptides derived from extracellular proteins. Class II molecules are expressed in antigen-presenting cells (APC: B lymphocytes, dendritic cells, macrophages).

Gene structure and polymorphisms 
The alpha chain is approximately 33-35 kDa. It is encoded by 5 exons, exon one encodes the leader peptide, exons 2 and 3 encode the two extracellular domains, exon 4 encodes the transmembrane and the cytoplasmic tail. Within the DP molecule both the alpha chain and the beta chain contain the polymorphisms specifying the peptide binding specificities, resulting in up to 4 different molecules.

See also
 Major histocompatibility complex
 Human leukocyte antigen
 HLA-DP

References